Hutchings High School (or HHS) is a co-educational school and junior college in Pune, Maharashtra, India, with classes from pre-nursery up to class 12. It is an Anglo-India school registered since 1879. The school is affiliated to the Indian Certificate of Secondary Education board. It was started by Emily Hutchings, a missionary.

History
Emily Hutchings, a missionary, arrived in Pune in 1904. She established a small school for 25 underprivileged girls and ran it for some time until funds ran out. The Bishop of the Methodist Church, William Taylor, then authorised church funds to be allocated to the school and thereafter the church became its main supporter. Hutchings died on 15 April 1942 at the age of 92. The current principal is Ms.
Rita Katawati.

See also
List of schools in Pune
List of Christian Schools in India

References

External links 
 

Schools in Colonial India
Primary schools in India
High schools and secondary schools in Maharashtra
Christian schools in Maharashtra
Schools in Pune
Educational institutions established in 1879
1879 establishments in India